Subhojit Paul (born 30 December 1984) is an Indian former cricketer. He played one first-class match for Bengal in 2006.

See also
 List of Bengal cricketers

References

External links
 

1984 births
Living people
Indian cricketers
Bengal cricketers
Cricketers from Kolkata
Mumbai Champs cricketers